Senator Dougherty may refer to:

Charles F. Dougherty (born 1937), Pennsylvania State Senate
Charles Dougherty (Florida politician) (1850–1915), Florida State Senate
John Dougherty (Illinois politician) (1806–1879), Ohio State Senate
Pat Dougherty (born 1948), Missouri State Senate

See also
Senator Doherty (disambiguation)